The Walter Junior was a family of four cylinder air cooled horizontally-opposed engines produced by Walter Aircraft Engines in Czechoslovakia in the 1930s for aircraft, characterised by a bore and stroke of , a displacement of  and producing roughly .

The Junior was also built in Poland as the P.Z. Inż. Junior.

Variants 
Walter Junior 4-I
 at 2,000 rpm.

Walter Junior-Major
 at 2,100 rpm (nominal),   at 2,350 rpm (maximum). 

P.Z. Inż. Junior
Approximately 600 engines manufactured under license in Poland by Państwowe Zakłady Inżynierii, Warsaw.

Elizalde J4
Approximately 150 engines manufactured under license in Spain by Elizalde SA Barcelona.

Applications

Adaro Chirta
Aero A.34
Beneš-Mráz Be-150 Beta-Junior
Breda Ba.15
de Havilland Puss Moth
González Gil-Pazó GP-1
Hispano-Suiza E-34
Hopfner HS-10/32
Praga BH-111
RWD 5
RWD 8
RWD 10

Specifications

See also

References

Junior
Aircraft air-cooled inline piston engines
1930s aircraft piston engines
Inverted aircraft piston engines